First Deputy Prime Minister of Ukraine is a government post of the Cabinet of Ukraine. In the absence of the prime minister of Ukraine, the first vice prime minister performs his or her duties as the acting prime minister. In 1991, the post was grandfathered from the already existing first deputy chairman that was part of the Council of Ministers of the Ukrainian SSR.

In an absence of the first vice prime minister, his or her functions are performed by other vice prime ministers who are members of the Cabinet of Ministers. Similarly to the prime minister, all official duties of the first vice prime minister are supported by the Secretariat of the Cabinet of Ministers.

Along with other members of the Cabinet of Ministers, a newly appointed first vice prime minister takes the same oath of office at a plenary session of the Verkhovna Rada (Ukrainian parliament). According to Article 10 of the Law of Ukraine about the Cabinet of Ministers, a member of the Cabinet of Ministers (except the prime minister) who refuses to take the oath is considered to have refused to accept the post. Every newly appointed member of an already existing cabinet needs to take the oath at the next plenary session of the Verkhovna Rada.

List of first vice prime ministers of Ukraine

Council of Ministers of the Ukrainian SSR

Cabinet of Ministers of Ukraine
In April 1991 the Council of Ministers represented by existing government of Vitold Fokin and created by 12th convocation of the Verkhovna Rada of Ukrainian SSR was renamed into the Cabinet of Ministers. With adoption of the Act of Independence of Ukraine, the Ukrainian SSR was officially renamed into Ukraine. Because of the 1991 August Putsch in Moscow, the Communist Party was prohibited in Ukraine. In February 1992 there was adopted the new coat of arms.

Notes

References

External links
 Law of Ukraine About the Cabinet of Minesters. Verkhovna Rada website

Government of Ukraine
Politics of Ukraine